Yong-ho is a Korean masculine given name. The meaning of the name differs based on the hanja used to write each syllable of the name. There are 24 hanja with the reading "yong" and 49 hanja with the reading "ho" on the South Korean government's official list of hanja which may be used in given names. Additionally, names beginning with the hanja meaning "dragon" may be pronounced and spelled either as Yong-ho or Ryong-ho. The latter spelling is standard in North Korea and among Koreans in China; see North–South differences in the Korean language.

People with this name include:

Politics and government
Paek Yong-ho (born 1945), North Korean politician, General Secretary to the Central Committee of the Red Cross Society of North Korea
Cho Yong-Ho (born 1955), South Korean judge
Ri Yong-ho (politician) (born 1956), North Korean diplomat, Minister of Foreign Affairs since May 2016

Sport
Pak Yong-ho (born 1974), South Korean football defender (J2 League)
Jang Yong-ho (born 1976), South Korean archer
Park Yong-ho (born 1981), South Korean football centre-back (K League 1)
Yoon Yong-ho (born 1996), South Korean football midfielder (K League 1)

Other
Francis Hong Yong-ho (1906–?), Korean Roman Catholic priest disappeared by North Korea in 1949

See also
List of Korean given names
Thae Yong-ho (born 1962), North Korean diplomat who defected to South Korea in 2016
Younghoe Koo (born 1994) South Korean-born American football player

References

Korean masculine given names